Highway 781 is a provincial highway in the Canadian province of Saskatchewan. It runs from Highway 12 near Petrofka to Highway 685. Highway 781 is about 28 km (17 mi.) long.

See also 
Roads in Saskatchewan
Transportation in Saskatchewan

References 

781